The High Commissioner of the United Kingdom to Mozambique is the United Kingdom's foremost diplomatic representative in the Republic of Mozambique, and head of the UK's diplomatic mission in Maputo.

Mozambique gained independence from Portugal in 1975. From then until 1995 the British heads of mission were ambassadors. In 1996 Mozambique joined the Commonwealth of Nations; Commonwealth countries exchange High Commissioners rather than ambassadors, so since 1996 the heads of mission have been High Commissioners.

Heads of mission

Ambassadors
1975–1979: John Lewen
1979–1980: Achilles Papadopoulos
1980–1984: John Stewart
1984–1985: Eric Vines
1986–1989: James Allan
1989–1992: Maeve Fort
1992–1995: Richard Edis

High Commissioners
1996–2000: Bernard Everett
2000–2003: Robert Dewar
2003–2007: Howard Parkinson
2007–2010: Andrew Soper
2010–2014: Shaun Cleary
2014–2018: Joanna Kuenssberg

2018–: NneNne Iwuji-Eme

References

Mozambique
United Kingdom
 
United Kingdom